On Leaves of Grass is an album composed by John Zorn inspired by the works of Walt Whitman and performed by the Nova Quartet, John Medeski, Kenny Wollesen, Trevor Dunn, and Joey Baron, which was recorded in New York City in March 2014 and released on the Tzadik label. The album is the fourth by the quartet following 2011's Nova Express and At the Gates of Paradise and 2013's Dreamachines.

Reception
On The Quietus, Sean Kitching wrote  "For anyone unaware of the gentler side of Zorn's music, as best represented by the album The Gift, or the four albums by his Dreamers project, the restraint and strength of melody showcased on this recording may come of something of a shock. The stellar level of musicianship displayed across Zorn's often genre-defying works, however, is always a given constant, and there are some breathtakingly beautiful moments here... Taken on its own merits, this is an accessible release that reveals surprising depths beneath its surface subtlety with repeated listening. Seen within the greater context of Zorn's overall canon, it further reinforces his position as one of the most diverse and prolific composers working today".

Track listing
All compositions by John Zorn
 "Whispers of Heavenly Death" - 5:35
 "Song at Sunset" - 3:22   
 "Halcyon Days" - 4:26   
 "Portals" - 4:03   
 "Sea Drift" - 5:09   
 "Song of the Open Road" - 3:47   
 "The Body Electric" - 2:55   
 "Mystic Cyphers" - 4:30   
 "America" - 14:23

Personnel
John Medeski - piano
Kenny Wollesen - vibraphone
Trevor Dunn - bass
Joey Baron - drums
Ikue Mori - electronics (track 8)

Production
Marc Urselli - engineer, audio mixer
John Zorn and Kazunori Sugiyama – producers

References

2014 albums
John Zorn albums
Albums produced by John Zorn
Tzadik Records albums
Musical settings of poems by Walt Whitman